Miriam Glazer-Ta'asa (born 11 August 1929) is an Israeli former politician who served as a member of the Knesset for Likud between 1981 and 1988, and as Deputy Minister of Education and Culture from 1981 until 1984.

Biography
Miriam Ta'asa' was born in Yemen to a Mizrahi Jewish family and in 1929, Glazer-Ta'asa immigrated to the British Mandate of Palestine (now Israel) with her family in 1934. She grew up in the Neve Tzedek neighbourhood of Tel Aviv and attended the Talpiot Gymnasium. She joined the Irgun in 1945, later becoming an officer, and served in the IDF after Israeli independence.

She went on to study at the Hebrew University of Jerusalem, where she earned a bachelor's degree, and the Jewish Theological Seminary of America, where she earned a master's. Between 1951 and 1980 she worked as the headteacher at the Johanna Jabotinsky high school in Be'er Ya'akov. From 1978 until 1980 she also lectured at the Levinsky Teachers' Seminary.

In 1981 she was elected to the Knesset on the Likud list, and on 11 August that year was appointed Deputy Minister of Education and Culture. She was re-elected in 1984, but was not re-appointed to her deputy ministerial post, though she did become chairwoman of the Immigration and Absorption Committee. She lost her seat in the 1988 elections.

Personal life
She married Haim Glazer in 1955, and remained so until his death in 2009. They had three sons.

References

External links

1929 births
Yemenite Jews
Yemeni emigrants to Mandatory Palestine
Irgun members
Israeli soldiers
Hebrew University of Jerusalem alumni
Jewish Theological Seminary of America alumni
Israeli educators
Israeli women educators
Living people
Likud politicians
Women members of the Knesset
Members of the 10th Knesset (1981–1984)
Members of the 11th Knesset (1984–1988)
Israeli female military personnel
Deputy ministers of Israel
Israeli people of Yemeni-Jewish descent
Israeli Mizrahi Jews